The United Nations General Assembly Sixth Committee (also known as the Legal Committee or C6) is one of six main committees of the General Assembly of the United Nations. It deals primarily with legal matters and is the primary forum for the consideration of international law and other legal matters concerning the United Nations.

Mandate 
The United Nations General Assembly has an express mandate to promote the progressive development of public international law as laid out in the Charter of the United Nations. Specifically, Article 13 of the Charter states that the General Assembly has the authority to "initiate studies and make recommendations for the purpose of: (a) promoting international co-operation in the political field and encouraging the progressive development of international law and its codification."

Subsequent practice has interpreted this provision as a broad authorization to elaborate new treaties on the widest range of issues, to adopt them, and to recommend them to states for their subsequent signature, ratification or accession. While international law-making negotiations take place in a variety of specialized bodies of the United Nations, depending on their actual subject-matter, those negotiations related to general international law are usually held at the Sixth Committee.

Composition and method of work 
The Sixth Committee has universal membership, as such all United Nations member states are entitled to representation in its proceedings. Non-member states with observer status may also attend and participate in the discussions of the committee.

The Sixth Committee meets every year for six weeks in parallel with the General Assembly's annual session, with its work beginning after the general debate and finishing by mid-November. Occasionally, the committee may also be reconvened upon request of the General Assembly to address substantive questions. Before the work of the committee begins, the General Assembly assigns to it a list of agenda items to be discussed. Common agenda items include:
 The promotion of justice and international law
 Accountability and internal United Nations justice matters
 Drug control
 Crime prevention
 Combating international terrorism
The committee also hears the annual reports of its reporting bodies, as well as considers requests for observer status in the General Assembly.

The committee does not hold a general debate at the start of its session, instead discussing its agenda items one by one, following a program of work adopted at its first meeting. Following formal discussions and negotiations, any adopted proposals are submitted to the plenary of the General Assembly for final adoption. If a particular issue proves too complex for the committee, it may refer it to the International Law Commission, or it may create an ad hoc committee to discuss it.

The highlight of the Sixth Committee's work is the "International Law Week" beginning at the end of October, when top legal advisers from member states meet in New York to consider the report of the International Law Commission. Additionally, during the week, the reports of the International Court of Justice and the International Criminal Court are also presented to the plenary of the General Assembly.

Reporting bodies 
The following bodies all report to the General Assembly through the Sixth Committee: 
 Committee on Relations with the Host Country
 International Law Commission
 Special Committee on the Charter of the United Nations and on the Strengthening of the Role of the Organization
 United Nations Commission on International Trade Law
 United Nations Programme of Assistance in the Teaching, Study, Dissemination, and Wider Appreciation of International Law
 Various ad hoc Committees established by the General Assembly in the context of the work of C6

Current state 
In its 76th session, the committee will focus on:

   Criminal accountability of United Nations officials and experts on mission
 	Report of the United Nations Commission on International Trade Law on the work of its fifty-fourth session
 	United Nations Programme of Assistance in the Teaching, Study, Dissemination and Wider Appreciation of International Law
 	Report of the International Law Commission on the work of its seventy-second session
 	Crimes against humanity
 	Report of the Special Committee on the Charter of the United Nations and on the Strengthening of the Role of the Organization
 	The rule of law at the national and international levels
 	The scope and application of the principle of universal jurisdiction
 	Protection of persons in the event of disasters
 	Strengthening and promoting the international treaty framework
 	Measures to eliminate international terrorism
 	Revitalization of the work of the General Assembly
 	Programme planning
 	Administration of justice at the United Nations
 	Report of the Committee on Relations with the Host Country
 	Observer status for the Cooperation Council of Turkic-speaking States in the General Assembly
 	Observer status for the Eurasian Economic Union in the General Assembly
 	Observer status for the Community of Democracies in the General Assembly
 	Observer status for the Ramsar Convention on Wetlands Secretariat in the General Assembly
 	Observer status for the Global Environment Facility in the General Assembly
 	Observer status for the International Organization of Employers in the General Assembly
 	Observer status for the International Trade Union Confederation in the General Assembly
 	Observer status for the Boao Forum for Asia in the General Assembly
 	Observer status for the International Solar Alliance in the General Assembly

Bureau 
The following make up the bureau of the Sixth Committee for the 76th session of the General Assembly:

Treaties and resolutions negotiated at the Sixth Committee 
The following treaties and resolutions have been negotiated, as a whole or in part, at the Sixth Committee:

 The 1961 Vienna Convention on Diplomatic Relations
 The 1969 Vienna Convention on the Law of Treaties
 The 1970 Declaration on Principles of International Law, Friendly Relations and Co-operation among States in accordance with the Charter of the United Nations
 The 1973 Convention on the Prevention and Punishment of Crimes against Internationally Protected Persons, including Diplomatic Agents (Protection of Diplomats Convention)
 The 1978 Vienna Convention on Succession of States in respect of Treaties 
 The 1979 International Convention against the Taking of Hostages (Hostages Convention)
 The 1995 Convention on the Safety of United Nations and Associated Personnel
 The 1994 Declaration on Measures to Eliminate International Terrorism 
 Also 1996 Supplement to the Declaration, adopted by General Assembly resolution 51/210, 17 December 1996
 The 1997 International Convention for the Suppression of Terrorist Bombings (Terrorist Bombing Convention)
 The 1997 Convention on the Law of Non-Navigational Uses of International Watercourses
 The 1998 Rome Statute of the International Criminal Court
 The 1999 International Convention for the Suppression of the Financing of Terrorism (Terrorist Financing Convention)
 The 2001 Draft Articles on the Responsibility of States for Internationally Wrongful Acts
 The 2005 International Convention for the Suppression of Acts of Nuclear Terrorism (Nuclear Terrorism Convention)
 The 2006 United Nations Declaration on Human Cloning

Since 2000 the Sixth Committee has been elaborating a Comprehensive Convention on International Terrorism to complement the existing counter-terrorism instruments. That proposed treaty has not yet been adopted.

See also 

 United Nations General Assembly First Committee
 United Nations General Assembly Second Committee
 United Nations General Assembly Third Committee
 United Nations General Assembly Fourth Committee
 United Nations General Assembly Fifth Committee

References

External links 
 

6
International law